Tobias Barreto de Meneses (June 7, 1839 – June 26, 1889) was a Brazilian poet, philosopher, jurist and literary critic. He is famous for creating the "Condorism" and revolutionizing Brazilian Romanticism and poetry. He is patron of the 38th chair of the Brazilian Academy of Letters.

Life
Barreto was born in Vila de Campos do Rio Real (renamed "Tobias Barreto" in his honor in 1909), a town in the southern part of Sergipe. He learnt his first letters with Manuel Joaquim de Oliveira Campos, and he also studied Latin with priest Domingos Quirino. Barreto was so dedicated to the course that, in the future, he would become a Latin professor in Itabaiana.

In 1861 he left for Bahia in order to attend a seminary; however, having soon realized that it was not his vocation, he quit. Between 1864 and 1865 he became a private tutor in many subjects. He also tried to become a Latin (and later Philosophy) teacher at the Ginásio Pernambucano, but was not successful at the institution.

Barreto was an enthusiast of the German culture, such an interest being induced by the reading of Ernst Haeckel and Ludwig Büchner. Following Haeckel, he was a noted early Darwinian in Brazil. For this reason he established a German language-newspaper, Der Deutsche Kämpfer (German for The German Fighter). It was short-lived and had little influence.

Moving away to Escada, he married a colonel's daughter. He spent ten years there before returning to Recife. He died there in 1889 at a friend's house.

Works
 Brasilien, wie es ist (German for Brazil as it is — 1876)
 Ensaio de Pré-História da Literatura Alemã (1879)
 Filosofia e Crítica (1879)
 Estudos Alemães (1879)
 Dias e Noites (1881)
 Menores e Loucos (1884)
 Discursos (1887)
 Polêmicas (1901; posthumous)

References

External links
 Another biography of Tobias Barreto 
 Poems by Barreto 

1839 births
1889 deaths
Brazilian male poets
Brazilian philosophers
Brazilian writers in German
Romantic poets
People from Sergipe
Patrons of the Brazilian Academy of Letters
19th-century Brazilian poets
19th-century Brazilian male writers

bpy:টোবিয়াস বার্রেটো
ro:Tobias Barreto